Brian Kerr may refer to:

Brian Kerr (Irish football manager) (born 1953), Irish football manager (Republic of Ireland national team, Faroe Islands national team)
Brian Kerr (Scottish footballer) (born 1981), Scottish football player (Newcastle United, Motherwell, Hibernian, national team) and manager (Albion Rovers)
Brian Kerr (politician) (born 1945), Canadian politician
Brian Kerr, Baron Kerr of Tonaghmore (1948−2020), British Law Lord and former Lord Chief Justice of Northern Ireland